Loughton Residents Association is a residents association and local political party formed (as the Central Loughton Residents' Association) in 1981, and based in Loughton, Essex, United Kingdom.

LRA has always sought to influence events by putting up candidates for public office. The first such councillor to be elected was Howard Kleyn, elected to Essex County Council in May, 1981. See entry Politics of Loughton.

Election Results
As of the 2019 Epping Forest District Council election Loughton Residents currently hold 13 seats on Epping Forest District Council. It holds 20 of the 22 seats on Loughton Town Council and one on Essex County Council.

Borough Council elections

County Council elections

See also
Chris Pond (politician)
Stephen Pewsey

External links
 Papers at the National Archives

Locally based political parties in England